Calycobathra sahidanella is a moth in the family Cosmopterigidae. It was described by Kasy in 1968. It is found in south-eastern Iran.

The wingspan is 8.3-10.5 mm. The forewings are yellowish-grey with a weak reddish hue. The hindwings are yellowish-grey. Adults have been recorded on wing in mid-May.

References

External links
Natural History Museum Lepidoptera generic names catalog

Moths described in 1968
Chrysopeleiinae